Giovanna Bruna Baldacci (19 November 1886 - ? after 1910) was an Italian composer, pianist and poet. She was born in Pistoia, Italy, and studied piano and composition at the Istituto Musicale in Florence with Francesco Cilea and Moretti.

After completing her studies, Baldacci worked as a concert pianist in Italy and Switzerland. She also taught choral singing and contributed articles to professional journals. In 1910 she won first prize for composition in an Italian Lyceum competition.

Works
Baldacci composed mostly songs and piano pieces. Selected works include:
I mesi dell’anno, children's chorale
Madrigale for three voices and piano

References

1886 births
Year of death unknown
20th-century classical composers
Italian music educators
Italian women classical composers
Italian classical composers
20th-century Italian composers
Women music educators
20th-century women composers
20th-century Italian women